The Library Project is a non-profit organization that donates books and libraries to under financed schools and orphanages in China and Vietnam. The Library Project was founded on the principle that education is change and the key to breaking the cycle of poverty in the developing world. The Library Project gets the local community involved through book drives and awareness raising, and partnering with local charities and companies. Since 2006, The Library Project has established over 600 libraries and donated more than 350,000 local and English language books to rural elementary schools and orphanages throughout China and Vietnam with another 350 planned for completion in 2012.

Programs
The Library Project has three distinct programs. All books are purchased in-country via generous individual or company donations or acquired through local community based book drives.

Elementary School Program — Each elementary school receives bi-lingual children's books, tables and chairs, paint and posters.

Orphanage Program — Each small orphanage receives bi-lingual children's books, tables and chairs, paint and posters as well as games and floor mats.

2008 Earthquake Program — The Library Project has provided books and libraries for elementary schools and orphanages in Sichaan and Shanxi Provinces as they have rebuilt as a result of the devastating 2008 earthquake.

Results

 Providing access to books to over 200,000 children
 Donating over 350,000 English and local language children’s books, encyclopedias and reference books
 Creating libraries
 Establishing over 600 libraries in rural elementary schools and orphanages in 21 provinces throughout China and Vietnam

Locations
The Library Project works in some of the most remote regions of China. TLP has established libraries in 21 provinces throughout China with special focus on Sichuan, Anhui and Shaaxi provinces In 2013, TLP expanded their operations within Vietnam.

Some of regions and provinces The Library Project works: 
Anhui Province: Fuyang, Hefei
Beijing
Chongqing
Guangdong Province: Heyuan, Qingyuan
Guizhou Province: Guiyang
Hubei Province: Wuhan, Xiangfan
Inner Mongolia Province: Erdos, Huhhot
Jiangsu Province: Wuxi
Jilin Province: Changchun
Liaoning Province: Dalian, Dandong, Shenyang
Ningxia Province: Yinchuan
Shaanxi Province: Xi’an, Baoji, Ankang, Yanan, Weinan, Hanzhong, Xianyang
Shandong Province: Jinan, Linyi, Dongying
Shanghai
Shanxi Province: Taiyuan
Sichuan Province: Chengdu, Guanghan, Guangyuan
Xinjiang Province: Urmuqi
Yunnan Province: Kunming

References

External links
 The Library Project Website

Educational charities
Child-related organizations in China
Child education organizations
Charities based in Arizona
Library-related organizations
Organizations promoting literacy
Foreign charities operating in China